Tropical Storm Lionrock, known in the Philippines as Tropical Depression Lannie, was a tropical storm which caused minor damage to the Philippines, Vietnam, and Hainan Island. Lionrock was the 17th named storm of the 2021 Pacific typhoon season. Six people perished due to the storm: three in the Philippines, two in Vietnam, and one in Hong Kong. According to Aon Benfield, economic losses totaled US$47 million.  Tropical Storm Kompasu affected many areas, previously impacted by Lionrock, only a few days later.

Meteorological history 

At that time, satellite visible imagery revealed a disorganized but broad area of circulation with flaring strong thunderstorms. Later analysis by the agency indicated a favorable environment for further development of the system, with warm  sea surface temperatures, low wind shear and good equatorial outflow. Meanwhile, the Philippine Atmospheric, Geophysical and Astronomical Services Administration (PAGASA) upgraded the system to a tropical depression on 2:00 PHT (18:00 UTC) of October 3, assigning it the name Lannie from their naming list as it was already present in their Philippine Area of Responsibility. Also that day, the JTWC issued a Tropical Cyclone Formation Alert on the system as it showed enough convection on the west of a discernible low-level circulation center while tracking west-northwestward.

However, a trough associated with the disturbance crossed the Philippines, the JTWC subsequently canceled their TCFA on the system and lowered the probability of the system's development to "medium". The PAGASA, however, continued to track Lannie as it made 8 landfalls in the country; first at 04:30 PHT (20:00 UTC) on Bucas Grande Island, then on Cagdianao in the Dinagat Islands, then over Liloan and Padre Burgos in Southern Leyte, then Mahanay Island and Getafe in Bohol, San Fernando in Cebu then over Guihulngan, Negros Oriental before emerging into the Sulu Sea. Continuing its track to the west-northwest, it made two more landfalls in Palawan; one on Iloc Island in Linapacan and over El Nido before finally moving over and accelerated into the South China Sea. At 14:30 UTC of October 4, the JTWC reissued a TCFA once again on the system as it reorganized along with a conducive environment in the area. A day later at 06:00 UTC, the Japan Meteorological Agency (JMA) recognized the system in their bulletins as a tropical depression. Lannie exited the PAR at 11:00 PhST (03:00 UTC) on October 6 as it slightly inclined northwestward.

On October 7 at 09:00 UTC, the JTWC further upgraded the storm to a tropical depression, receiving the designation 22W from the agency. The system, at that time, also consolidated further while transitioning to a monsoon depression as it continued to maintain a broad center with its wind field contracting along with 25-30 knot winds occurring in its core. Meanwhile, while centered over the northern Paracel Islands, the JMA reported that the system intensified to a tropical storm according to surface wind analysis and Dvorak ratings, nine hours later. The agency named the system Lionrock while the storm became stationary due to weak steering flow. However, the JTWC only followed suit on the next day as it turned northward as it was steered by the southwestern periphery of a subtropical ridge located to the northeast. The storm maintained this intensity before making landfall over Qionghai on 22:50 CST (14:50 UTC), further organizing its LLCC and its overall structure while located inland. However, it weakened slightly while over the central part of the island, although its convective banding continued to consolidate.

Early on October 9, Lionrock emerged into the very warm and conducive waters of the Gulf of Tonkin. However, it maintained its intensity of  before it made its last landfall over Haiphong, near Cat Bi International Airport on 09:00 UTC on the next day, with the JTWC issuing its final warning as a tropical depression. Although, its LLC remained somewhat defined on radar imagery but its winds weakened upon moving inland. The JMA also downgraded Lionrock to a depression three hours back as it tracked westward while over Quảng Ninh Province of Vietnam.

Preparations and impacts

Philippines 
Upon the PAGASA's designation for the storm, several areas in Mimaropa, whole Visayas and northeastern Mindanao were placed under storm signal #1. The weather agency also warned flash floods, heavy rains, landslides and gusty winds from Lannie as the system moved over the country. Gale warnings were also in effect.

Metro Manila and some provinces in Luzon, including Isabela and Cagayan experienced heavy downpours from the "trough extension" of Lannie. In Siraway, Zamboanga del Norte, some residents living in the area were evacuated due to the same effect, causing waistline floods while nearly 200 families in Pikit, Cotabato City were rescued due to rain-induced flash floods that occurred from October 3–4. A family of three were also moved into safety by the Philippine Coast Guard (PCG) on October 4 when their boat sank during the high waves from the storm between Pamilacan Island and Loay, Bohol while two more fishermen were rescued by the authorities off Abacan River in Cortes. In Tanjay, a man slipped into a spillway and were subsequently helped by stranded residents near the area while 50 households were evacuated to safety as a river overflowed in Bais, Negros Oriental. Landslides were also reported on Cebu City and Talisay City while vaccination activities for October 5 on Zamboanga City were canceled as a result of bad weather and its resultant flooding in houses and rice fields. Five vessels and fifteen passengers in Palawan were stranded as a result of Lannie, the PCG reported on the same day.

Four fatalities were already reported in the country as a result of the storm, three due to drowning in Capiz and Cebu and the other one is unknown.

Hong Kong and Macau 
Despite Lionrock being far away from Hong Kong and Macau, its large windfield prompted a Strong Wind Signal No. 3 for the territories. Further, it was upgraded to No. 8 Southeast Gale or Storm Signal on October 9 and it lasted 22 hours before being beaten by Kompasu a few days later at 23 hours and 20 minutes. In addition, Lionrock was 560 km away from Hong Kong when it triggered the issuance of Signal 8 by the HKO beating the previous record held by Nangka the year before at 450 km.

On October 8, a 52-year old Frenchman was killed while his 57-year old friend was injured when their sailboats sank due to strong winds from the storm off Po Toi Island, Beaufort Island in Hong Kong. A tree uprooted in Tsuen Wan-bound Lung Cheung Road, disrupting a lane while downed trees also affected Kowloon City, Prince Edward Road West and Cheung Fai Road in Tsing Yi. Scaffolding also fell on a street in Wong Tai Sin and over Broadwood Road due to strong winds from Lionrock, trapping two people in their respective cars. Two female workers were also stranded inside. They were rescued subsequently by authorities, with one of them being unconscious. She died subsequently, being the fifth casualty from the storm.

Mainland China 
Emergency response teams with 95 vehicles, 2,471 people, 438 emergency repair vehicles and 358 generators were put on standby as Lionrock approached Hainan Island. The area's electric company also trimmed tree branches as a precaution for blackouts. 12 bus lines passing over the university town in Haikou were suspended as a result of the storm while the Haikou Crater Park were closed starting on October 8. 290 drainage workers also inspected drainage facilities on Hainan on October 8 while 75 individuals from Longhua District were relocated from their houses to a safe place to ride out the storm. Over 3,434 people from the area were evacuated while more than 20,000 fishing boats and vessels were asked to return to ports due to Lionrock. A blue warning was issued for mainland southeastern China, on the same day.

In Zhuhai, heavy rainfall fell due to Lionrock in various places, with  being recorded from October 8 to 10 in Wanshan Town, leading to the storm being one of the wettest tropical cyclones ever recorded, in Mainland China. Many roadways were flooded and impassable, causing the cancellation of buses and the restriction of residents in the area. More than 60 shelters were also opened in Xiangzhou for possible evacuees. Traffic authorities on the area implemented traffic control from October 10. Ship activities were also suspended. Hengqin Bridge were also closed for motorists due to heavy downpours. Power in the city were also cut as a precaution; its electric company Zhuhai Power Supply Bureau promised that electricity will be restored as conditions become better.

Primary and secondary schools in some districts were closed as a result. Authorities in the area performed several rescues on people being stranded in floods and those who can't evacuate themselves. Cars were also inundated by these floods. 165 people in total were rescued and 65 were evacuated to safety.

Vietnam
Floods swept away one person and seven cattles in Duy Xuyên District, Quảng Nam Province On Saturday, the victim was confirmed dead. On the same day, the storm killed one sailor in Thái Bình province. As Lionrock made its landfall over the country on October 10, torrential downpours also affected several provinces in the country.

Thailand
In Thailand, one person drowned due to high waves from Lionrock.

Notes

See also 

 Weather of 2021
 Tropical cyclones in 2021
 Tropical Storm Kujira (2015) – Made landfall in a similar area in June 2015 and took a similar path
 Tropical Storm Sinlaku (2020) - Made landfall in a simar area in August 2020

References

External links 

 JMA General Information of Tropical Storm Lionrock (2117) from Digital Typhoon
 JMA Best Track Data of Tropical Storm Lionrock (2117) 
 JMA Best Track Data (Graphics) of Tropical Storm Lionrock (2117)
 JTWC Best Track Data of Tropical Storm 22W (Lionrock)
 22W.LIONROCK from the U.S. Naval Research Laboratory

2021 Pacific typhoon season
Lionrock
Typhoons in the Philippines
Typhoons in China
Typhoons in Vietnam
October 2021 events in Asia
Lionrock